Eddie Aila is a Papua New Guinean rugby footballer who represented Papua New Guinea at rugby league in the 2000 World Cup.

Playing career
Aila began his career playing rugby union before joining the Wynnum Manly Seagulls in the Queensland Cup. From there he was selected for Papua New Guinea and he played at the 2000 World Cup. Aila finished his national career having played in five test matches.

Aila later returned to rugby union joining the Souths Rugby club. He plays for Logan City and coaches their colts side.

References

Living people
Expatriate rugby union players in Australia
Papua New Guinea national rugby league team players
Papua New Guinean expatriate rugby union players
Papua New Guinean expatriate sportspeople in Australia
Papua New Guinean rugby league players
Papua New Guinean rugby union players
Papua New Guinean sportsmen
Rugby league centres
Rugby league wingers
Souths Logan Magpies players
Wynnum Manly Seagulls players
Year of birth missing (living people)